Ľuboš Micheľ (born 16 May 1968) is a retired Slovak football referee.

Referee career
At a young age, Micheľ refereed a number of games in Lebanon. 
Micheľ became a FIFA referee at the age of 25.

Micheľ was selected to referee the 2003 UEFA Cup Final in Seville, Spain, between Porto and Celtic, one of the biggest appointments for a UEFA referee.

Micheľ officiated at Euro 2004, taking charge of 3 games, including the quarter-final between Sweden and the Netherlands. He issued 16 yellow cards and 0 reds at an average of 5.33 cards per game, placing him sixth on the cards per game table.

In the 2004–05 UEFA Champions League, during the semi-final second leg match between Liverpool and Chelsea at Anfield in which the home team won by 1–0 and hence qualified for the Final, there was debate over whether a "ghost goal" had been scored by Liverpool winger Luis García. A computerised 're-enactment' suggested the ball had not crossed the line, and that Micheľ would have been unable to see it from his angle, while motion expert Mike Spann concluded that Micheľ had made the correct decision. Micheľ himself stated that his decision was based on the reaction of the assistant referee.

Micheľ was selected to be the referee of the 2008 UEFA Champions League Final, the match between Manchester United and Chelsea. The match went to a penalty shootout which, after much excitement, was eventually won by Manchester United. Micheľ became only the second referee to give a red card in a UEFA Champions League Final (the first being Terje Hauge in 2006) when he sent Didier Drogba off in extra time for a slap at Nemanja Vidić's chin.

Michel was selected to be a referee at the UEFA Euro 2008, where he refereed the Group A game between Switzerland and Turkey, the Group C game between France and Italy and the quarter-final match between Netherlands and Russia.

On October 23, 2008, he retired from active referee activity due to problems with his Achilles’ tendon. His last match was the game Metalurh Zaporizhya against Metalist Kharkiv in the Ukrainian Premier League.

Micheľ was ranked the world's third best referee in 2005 by the IFFHS, second best in 2006 and third best again in 2007.

2002 FIFA World Cup 
When Micheľ took charge of the Paraguay v South Africa game at the 2002 FIFA World Cup, he became the first Slovak to referee a FIFA World Cup Finals match. (Three Slovak referees, Martin Macka (1958), Karol Galba (1962, 1966) and Vojtech Christov (1982, 1986) count to Czechoslovakia)

2006 FIFA World Cup
Micheľ was selected as one of 21 referees for the 2006 World Cup in Germany.  After his performance in the first two rounds, FIFA chose him as one of twelve referees to officiate the final eight games of the tournament.  Micheľ has handed out the second highest number of cards per match (8) of any referee in the tournament. The only person with a higher tally is Valentin Ivanov, who handed out an average of ten.

Micheľ matches have been considered tempestuous.  In the group stage he took charge of the game between Portugal and Mexico; the game ending 2–1 to Portugal. He issued 8 yellow cards, sent a player off for diving, gave two penalties, and rejected a claim for one in the second half.

In the Round of 16 he took charge of the Brazil-Ghana match, won by Brazil 3–0. He sent off one Ghanaian player for diving and ordered the Ghana coach, Ratomir Dujković, to leave the field after the coach argued with him about an offside goal.

Micheľ refereed the quarterfinals loss of Argentina to the hosts Germany, which was tied 1–1 and went into extra time and ended on penalty kicks. He handed out seven yellows during the match. Micheľ gave a red card to Argentina's unused substitute Leandro Damián Cufré for kicking Per Mertesacker during the post-game melee involving the two teams and some members of their coaching staffs.

Post referee career 
Micheľ was a manager of a car tyre factory outside of refereeing, and previously a teacher.  He speaks English, Russian, German and Polish in addition to his native Slovak. He founded the society Talent to support young Slovak football players. Micheľ has been a Member of National Council of the Slovak Republic since 2006.

On October 27, 2008, Micheľ signed a contract with Shakhtar Donetsk as the head of the international competitions department.

For a brief period of time between 2006 and 2010, Ľuboš Micheľ was serving as a lawmaker in the Slovak parliament, where he was elected in the 2006 elections.

Between December 2015 and November 2018, he worked for PAOK FC as Sporting Director and president. Since September 2021, Micheľ has worked as president for 1. FC Tatran Prešov.

In October 2022, Micheľ ran unsuccessfully for Mayor of Prešov.

References

External links 
 Micheľ interview 
 
 
 

1968 births
Living people
People from Stropkov
Sportspeople from the Prešov Region
Slovak football referees
FIFA World Cup referees
2006 FIFA World Cup referees
2002 FIFA World Cup referees
Czechoslovak football referees
UEFA Champions League referees
Olympic football referees
PAOK F.C. presidents
UEFA Euro 2004 referees
UEFA Euro 2008 referees
FC Shakhtar Donetsk non-playing staff
Members of the National Council (Slovakia) 2006-2010